Stan Kenton Conducts the Los Angeles Neophonic Orchestra is an album by bandleader Stan Kenton recorded in 1965 by Capitol Records.

Reception

Critical opinion remains divided. The Allmusic review by Scott Yanow observed "Much of the time the results are somewhat pompous and stiff... The music, like the project, had good intentions but is uneven". On All About Jazz William Grim wrote "It's nice to think there was a time in the not too distant past when an album like this could have gotten nominated for a Grammy. Fortunately, this CD gives us an insight into what was undoubtedly one of the most important experiments in the history of modern jazz".

Track listing
 "Fanfare" (Hugo Montenegro) - 3:09   
 "Prelude and Fugue" (John Williams) - 9:22   
 "Passacaglia and Fugue" (Allyn Ferguson) - 8:30
 "Music for an Unwritten Play" (Jim Knight) - 7:13
 "Adventure in Emotion: Pathos/Anger/Tranquility/Joy/Love and Hate" (Russell Garcia) - 15:02   
 "Piece for Soft Brass, Woodwinds and Percussion" (Clare Fischer) - 8:40 Bonus track on CD reissue  
Recorded at Capitol Studios in Hollywood, CA on September 27, 1965 (track 3), September 28, 1965 (track 5) and September 29, 1965 (tracks 1, 2, 4 & 6).

Personnel
Stan Kenton - conductor
Gary Barone, Frank Huggins, Ollie Mitchell, Ronnie Ossa, Dalton Smith - trumpet
Gil Falco, Bob Fitzpatrick, Vern Friley - trombone
Jim Amlotte - bass trombone
John Bambridge - tuba
John Cave, Vincent DeRosa, Bill Hinshaw, Arthur Maebe, Dick Perissi - French horn
Bud Shank - alto saxophone, clarinet, flute, alto flute, piccolo
Bill Perkins - alto saxophone, tenor saxophone, clarinet, flute, alto flute, piccolo
Bob Cooper - tenor saxophone, clarinet, bass clarinet, oboe
Don Lodice - tenor saxophone, baritone saxophone, clarinet, E-flat clarinet, bass clarinet, contrabass clarinet
John Lowe - baritone saxophone, bass saxophone, bass clarinet, flute, alto flute, piccolo
Emil Richards - vibraphone
Claude Williamson - piano
Dennis Budimir - guitar
John Worster - bass 
Nick Ceroli - drums 
Frank Carlson - tympani, percussion

References

Stan Kenton albums
1965 albums
Capitol Records albums
Albums conducted by Stan Kenton
Albums arranged by Clare Fischer
Albums recorded at Capitol Studios
Albums produced by David Axelrod (musician)
Albums produced by John Palladino